, provisional designation , is a trans-Neptunian object and damocloid from the outer Solar System. Its orbit is retrograde and comet-like, and has a high eccentricity. It was discovered on 4 September 2002 by astronomers with the LONEOS survey at Anderson Mesa Station, Arizona, in the United States. It is a slow rotator and potentially a tumbler as well. The object was probably ejected from the ecliptic by Neptune.

Orbit and classification 

 is a member of the damocloids, with a retrograde orbit and a negative TJupiter of −0.8340. It is also a trans-Neptunian object, as its orbit has a semi-major axis larger than that of Neptune (30.1 AU). The Minor Planet Center lists it as a critical object, centaur, and (other) unusual minor planet due to an orbital eccentricity of more than 0.5.

It orbits the Sun at a distance of 2.5–105 AU once every 396 years (semi-major axis of 53.92 AU). Its orbit has an eccentricity of 0.95 and an inclination of 119° with respect to the ecliptic. The body's observation arc begins with a precovery taken by Astrovirtel  at ESO's La Silla Observatory in February 2001, or 19 months prior to its official discovery observation at Anderson Mesa.

Numbering and naming 

This minor planet was permanently numbered  by the Minor Planet Center on 14 June 2003. As of 2018, it has not been named.

Physical characteristics 

The object has a B–R magnitude of 1.37, typical for most dynamical groups in the outer Solar System.

Rotation period 

Lightcurve analysis gave a rotation period of 200 hours with a brightness amplitude of 0.6 magnitude, indicative of an elongated, non-spherical shape. With a rotation period above 100 hours, it is a typical slow rotator.

Diameter and albedo 

According to the survey of minor-planet albedos of bodies in a comet-like orbit, carried out by Yanga Fernández in collaboration with David Jewitt and Scott Sheppard at the Institute for Astronomy, Hawaii,  measures 14.6 kilometers in diameter and its surface has an albedo of 0.098. Johnston's archive gives a rounded figure of 15 kilometers.

References

External links 
 List Of Centaurs and Scattered-Disk Objects, Minor Planet Center
 (65407) 2002 RP120, Small Bodies Data Ferret
 
 

065407
065407
065407
065407
065407
20020904
Minor planets with a retrograde orbit